Ante Bajic (born 22 August 1995) is an Austrian professional footballer who plays as an winger for Rapid Wien.

Career
Bajic is a product of the youth academies of Altheim and the German club Wacker Burghausen. He began his career with Union Gurten in the Austrian Regionalliga. He moved to Ried in the 2. Liga on 18 June 2018. He made his professional debut with Ried in a 3–0 2. Liga win over FC Liefering on 17 August 2018. After 80 appearances with Ried and helping them win the 2019–20 Austrian Football Second League, Bajic transferred to Rapid Wien on 13 June 2022.

Personal life
Born in Austria, Bajic is of Croatian descent.

Honours
Ried
2. Liga: 2019–20

References

External links
 
 OEFB Profile

1995 births
Living people
Footballers from Upper Austria
Austrian footballers
Austrian people of Croatian descent
SK Rapid Wien players
SK Austria Klagenfurt players
USK Anif players
Austrian Football Bundesliga players
2. Liga (Austria) players
Austrian Regionalliga players
Association football wingers
Austrian expatriate footballers
Austrian expatriate sportspeople in Germany
Expatriate footballers in Germany